Eremophila labrosa is a flowering plant in the figwort family, Scrophulariaceae and is endemic to Western Australia. It is a shrub with many hairy branches arising from near ground level, narrow, hooked leaves and mauve and blue flowers.

Description
The leaves are arranged alternately along the branches, linear in shape with a curved, hooked end.

The petal tube is purple on the upper surface, pale lilac below and white inside. The outside of the petal tube is densely covered with glandular hairs but the inside surface of the lobes is mostly glabrous. The central part of the lower lip is pushed up, closely the opening of the petal tube which is densely woolly inside. The 4 stamens are fully enclosed in the petal tube.

Taxonomy and naming 
The species was first formally described by Robert Chinnock in 2007 and the description was published in Eremophila and Allied Genera: A Monograph of the Plant Family Myoporaceae. The specific epithet (labrosa) is derived from the Latin labrosa meaning "large-lipped", referring to the prominent lower lip of the petal tube.

Distribution and habitat
This eremophila is common in the Hyden Grasspatch and Norseman districts in the Avon Wheatbelt, Coolgardie and Mallee
biogeographic regions.

Conservation status
Eremophila labrosa is classified as "not threatened" by the Western Australian Government Department of Parks and Wildlife.

Use in horticulture
This eremophila has an upright, narrow, open growth habit and is ideal for situations requiring such a shape, especially since it bears masses of lilac to purple flowers in spring to early summer. It can be propagated from cuttings at most times of the year and grown in most soil types, including clay, in full sun or partial shade. It is reasonably drought tolerant and can withstand heavy frosts.

References

Eudicots of Western Australia
labrosa
Endemic flora of Western Australia
Plants described in 2007
Taxa named by Robert Chinnock